We the Fallen is the fourth studio album by American band Psyclon Nine. The album was released on September 8, 2009, through Metropolis Records. This is the first album released by Psyclon Nine with new members Vlixx and Jon Siren.

The concept behind We the Fallen created by frontman Nero Bellum was the idea of himself as a "heartworm". Bellum had begun to "look at people like emotional parasites, worming their way into the hearts of their victims in order to have some sort of influence on their actions." The album takes a dark view on the concept of love and relationships.

Track listing
 "Soulless (The Makers Reflection)" [Featuring Johan Van Roy of Suicide Commando] - 2:14
 "We the Fallen" - 5:24
 "Heartworm" - 5:12
 "Thy Serpent Tongue" - 5:10
 "Bloodwork" - 4:39
 "The Derelict (God Forsaken)" - 2:21
 "Widowmaker" - 4:41 (Featuring Brandan Schieppati of Bleeding Through)
 "There But For the Grace of God" - 4:54
 "Of Decay (An Exit)" - 1:09
 "Suicide Note Lullaby" - 4:51
 "As One With the Flies" - 3:43
 "Under the Judas Tree" - 4:54

Personnel
Psyclon Nine
 Nero Bellum – vocals, Guitar
 Rotny Ford – lead guitar, synth, samples
 Abbey Nex – bass guitar
 Vlixx – synth, keys, percussion
 Jon Siren – drums, percussion, samples
Production
 Tracking and mixing by Jason Miller of Godhead

References

Psyclon Nine albums
2009 albums